Porn blocking or porn blocker can refer to:

 Internet censorship, when performed at the network level
 Content-control software, when performed at the device level